Niecon Developments is the property development Management arm of the Nikiforides Group, which started in the construction and development industry in Canberra in 1969, later expanding into Sydney and coastal New South Wales.

The Group relocated to South East Queensland in 1978 and was key in the creation of The Oracle in Broadbeach, Queensland.  Niecon also created  Nirvana by the Sea, a 15 story highrise resort apartment building at Kirra Beach, Coolangatta Queensland.

Niecon is a registered Trademark whose brand is used by development companies both within and outside the Nikiforides Group.

References

External links
 Twin-tower Oracle project poised to realise its promise

Construction and civil engineering companies of Australia
Companies based in Queensland
Construction and civil engineering companies established in 1985
Privately held companies of Australia
Australian companies established in 1985